This is a list of members of the Western Australian Legislative Assembly between the 1890 elections and the 1894 elections, known as the First Parliament. They held office under the Constitution Act 1889, which was given royal assent by Queen Victoria on 15 August 1890 and took effect on 21 October 1890 with a proclamation by the new Governor of Western Australia, Sir William Robinson.

Members

Notes
  The members for Ashburton (Septimus Burt), Bunbury (John Forrest), Fremantle (William Marmion) and Wellington (Harry Venn), upon being appointed as Ministers of the Crown, were required to resign their seats, which they did on 30 December 1890, and stand for their seats again at ministerial by-elections. All were unopposed, and were returned on 8 January 1891.
  On 30 December 1890, at the first sitting of parliament, George Leake resigned from the seat of Roebourne, and Horace Sholl was returned unopposed at the resulting byelection on 16 January 1891.
  In November 1891, Edward Vivien Harvey Keane resigned from the seat of Geraldton, and George Simpson was returned unopposed at the resulting byelection on 10 December 1891.
  In December 1891, Edward Scott resigned from the seat of Perth, and at the byelection on 12 January 1892, Thomas Molloy was elected to fill the vacancy.
  On 4 July 1892, George Randell resigned from the seat of Moore, and Henry Lefroy was returned unopposed at the resulting byelection on 11 August 1892.
  On 13 September 1892, David Symon resigned from the seat of South Fremantle, and at the byelection on 12 October 1892, Elias Solomon was elected to fill the vacancy.
  On 5 October 1892, Stephen Henry Parker resigned from the seat of York, and Frederick Monger was returned unopposed at the resulting byelection on 27 October 1892.
  On 7 January 1893, William Leonard Baker died, leaving the seat of East Kimberley vacant. Francis Connor was returned unopposed at the resulting byelection on 20 April 1893.

References

Sources
 
 

Members of Western Australian parliaments by term